Khajuwala Assembly constituency is one of constituencies of Rajasthan Legislative Assembly in the Bikaner (Lok Sabha constituency).

Khajuwala Constituency covers all voters from Khajuwala tehsil, Poogal tehsil, Chhatargarh tehsil and parts of Bikaner tehsil, which includes ILRC Kanasar and Chak Garbi, Nalbari and Udasar of ILRC Bikaner.

References

See also 
 Member of the Legislative Assembly (India)

Bikaner district
Assembly constituencies of Rajasthan